Cephas Chimedza (born 5 December 1984) is a Zimbabwean footballer who can play in a number of positions, left back, holding midfielder, attacking midfielder and left side midfield.

In 2004 he was voted Soccer star of the year in Zimbabwe.
He was part of the Zimbabwe team at the AFCON in 2006 scoring once against Ghana in a 2 -1 win.

References

External links

Cephas Chimedza at Footballdatabase

1984 births
Living people
Zimbabwean footballers
Zimbabwean expatriate footballers
Zimbabwe international footballers
2006 Africa Cup of Nations players
Beerschot A.C. players
Sint-Truidense V.V. players
K.V.C. Westerlo players
Belgian Pro League players
Expatriate footballers in Belgium
Zimbabwean expatriate sportspeople in Belgium
Royal Cappellen F.C. players
Association football midfielders